Old Town Hall is a historic town hall located at Wilmington, New Castle County, Delaware. It was built in 1798, and is a large two-story brick building in a late-Georgian / early-Federal style.  The roof is gently sloping and is topped by a large octagonal cupola and once had a wooden balustrade.  The building housed the Wilmington city government until 1916 and served as a focal point of many public events in Delaware's history.  The property is owned and managed by the Delaware Historical Society

It was added to the National Register of Historic Places in 1974.

References

External links

Historic American Buildings Survey in Delaware
City and town halls on the National Register of Historic Places in Delaware
Georgian architecture in Delaware
Federal architecture in Delaware
Government buildings completed in 1798
Buildings and structures in Wilmington, Delaware
Former seats of local government
1798 establishments in Delaware
National Register of Historic Places in Wilmington, Delaware
City and town halls in Delaware